Connie Inge-Lise Nielsen (born 3 July 1965) is a Danish actress. She has starred as Lucilla in the film Gladiator (2000) and as Hippolyta in the DC Extended Universe, beginning with Wonder Woman (2017).

She has also starred in films such as Soldier (1998), Mission to Mars (2000), One Hour Photo (2002), Basic (2003), The Hunted (2003), The Ice Harvest (2005), Nymphomaniac (2013), 3 Days to Kill (2014), Inheritance (2020), and Nobody (2021).

She also had roles in the NBC crime drama series Law & Order: Special Victims Unit (2006), the Starz political drama series Boss (2011–2012), the Fox crime thriller series The Following (2014), the TNT limited drama series I Am the Night (2019) and starred in the Channel 4 drama series  Close to Me in 2021.

Early life
Nielsen was born on 3 July 1965 in Frederikshavn and grew up in the village of Elling, Denmark. Her father, Bent Nielsen, was a bus driver, and her mother, Laila Inge-lise Matzigkeit (1945–2014), was an insurance clerk, who also acted and wrote musical reviews. She was raised as a member of the Church of Jesus Christ of Latter-day Saints, a Mormon. She began her acting career working alongside her mother on the local revue and variety scene. At 18, she traveled to Paris, France, where she worked as an actress and model, which led to further work and study in Italy—at drama school in Rome and in master classes with Lydia Styx, a teacher at Piccolo Teatro di Milano in Milan. She lived in Italy for many years before moving to the United States, where she still resides.

Career
Nielsen's feature film debut was the Jerry Lewis French film Par où t'es rentré ? On t'a pas vu sortir in 1984, followed by a role in the Italian mini-series Colletti Bianchi in 1988. She appeared in the Italian film Vacanze di Natale '91 (1991) and the French film Le Paradis Absolument (1993).

She moved to the United States in the mid-1990s and made her first appearance in a major English-language film in 1997 as Christabella Andreoli in The Devil's Advocate, starring opposite Al Pacino and Keanu Reeves. This first minor breakthrough led to roles in the films Permanent Midnight (1998), Rushmore (1998), and Soldier (1998).

In 2000, Nielsen appeared as Lucilla in Ridley Scott's Gladiator, starring opposite Russell Crowe and Joaquin Phoenix. Since then, she has starred in American films including Mission to Mars (2000), One Hour Photo (2002), The Hunted (2003), and Basic (2003), for which she had to cut off most of her hair. She also starred in the French thriller Demonlover (2002), directed by Olivier Assayas. She played the Irish mother to an orphan in A Shine of Rainbows (2009).

In 2004, Nielsen made her Danish film debut in the drama, Brødre (also known as Brothers), for which she won the Danish Best Actress Award, the Bodil, as well as Best Actress at the San Sebastian International Film Festival. She was also nominated for Best Actress at the European Film Awards. In 2006, Nielsen appeared in several episodes of Law & Order: Special Victims Unit as Detective Dani Beck. She filled in for Mariska Hargitay, who was on maternity leave at the time of filming.

With Charlotte Gainsbourg, Jamie Bell and Uma Thurman, Nielsen appeared in the 2014 Lars Von Trier film Nymphomaniac. She was featured in a series of promotional posters prior to the film's release, a campaign The Independent described as "shocking", observing that "Connie Nielsen appears somewhat moist in this poster for Nymphomaniac".

In 2015, she appeared on the TV-2 album Det gode liv where she sang along with Steffen Brandt on the track "Brev til Mona". In September 2018 she appeared in the pilot episode of the CBS drama FBI with Jeremy Sisto and Missy Peregrym.

Nielsen is most famously known as Queen Hippolyta in DC Extended Universe franchise, appeared in four films beginning with Wonder Woman (2017).

Personal life
From 2004 to 2012, Nielsen dated Metallica drummer and fellow Dane, Lars Ulrich. They have one son together, Bryce Thadeus Ulrich-Nielsen (born 21 May 2007, in San Francisco, California). She has an older son from her previous relationship with Fabio Sartor.

Nielsen is a polyglot, fluent in Danish, English, French, German, Italian, Norwegian, and Swedish. She also knows some Spanish.

Filmography

Film

Television

References

External links

 

1965 births
20th-century Danish actresses
21st-century Danish actresses
Best Actress Bodil Award winners
Danish actresses
Danish expatriates in the United States
Danish film actresses
Danish television actresses
Expatriate actresses in the United States
Living people
People from Frederikshavn